Khosrowabad (also Romanized as Khosrowābād) is a village in Kah Rural District, Central District, Davarzan County, Razavi Khorasan Province, Iran. At the 2006 census, its population was 346, in 102 families.

References 

Populated places in Davarzan County